Bâra is a commune in Neamț County, Western Moldavia, Romania. It is composed of three villages: Bâra, Negrești, and Rediu.

In Rediu, in the summer of 2014, the Maryam Mosque for Romanian converts to Islam was established.

References

Communes in Neamț County
Localities in Western Moldavia